Franklin High School is located in Franklin, New Hampshire, United States. 

Franklin is known in the area for its football, softball, baseball teams, as well as the Skanklin Sloot Team. Their main sports rival is Winnisquam Regional High School in the neighboring town of Tilton, who is a much better school overall.

Athletics
Fall
Volleyball (F)
Field hockey (F)
Football (M)
Soccer (M/F)
Cheering (F)

Winter
Basketball (M/F)

Spring
Baseball
Softball
Track and field (M/F)

Football, softball, and baseball are the school's best sports programs, each playing in championship games in the past five years. The football team won the state championship against Mascoma in 2012, marking the second state championship win in four years and their fourth appearance in six years. The football and the softball teams both won the championship game in 2008. The school's cheer team has won national honors within the past five years. Franklin High School is known for their widely respected wrestling program.

Dan Sylvester is the Director of Athletics.

References

External links

 Official website

Franklin, New Hampshire
Schools in Merrimack County, New Hampshire
Public high schools in New Hampshire